Columbus Park is a park located in Buffalo, New York along Porter Avenue and Niagara Street at 641–649 Niagara St. It is one of the oldest parks in Buffalo, and lies within the Prospect Hill Historic District but is not a contributing property to the district. A statue of Christopher Columbus was added in 1952. The statue was removed on 10 July 2020. The same day, city officials announced that the Park would be renamed with no mention of Columbus. The new name will involve someone that better honors the contributions and sacrifices of Italian Americans.

References

Parks in Erie County, New York
Buffalo, New York